Ferdinand Albert (German Ferdinand Albrecht; 29 May 1680 (O.S.), Bevern – 2 September 1735 (O.S.), Salzdahlum), Duke of Brunswick-Lüneburg, was an officer in the army of the Holy Roman Empire. He was prince of Wolfenbüttel during 1735.

Life
Ferdinand Albert was the fourth son of Ferdinand Albert I, Duke of Brunswick-Lüneburg and Christina Wilhelmina of Hesse-Eschwege.

Ferdinand Albert fought on the side of Emperor Leopold I in the War of the Spanish Succession. In 1704 he became adjutant of the Emperor; in 1707 major general, and in 1711 lieutenant field marshal. During the Austro-Turkish War of 1716-18, he fought under Prince Eugene of Savoy, participated in the battles of Belgrade and Petrovaradin, and became commander of the fortress of Komárno. In 1723, he became field marshal, and in 1733, Generalfeldmarschall.

After the death of his cousin and father-in-law Louis Rudolph in March 1735, Ferdinand Albert inherited the Principality of Wolfenbüttel and resigned as field marshal. He died six months later.

Marriage
Ferdinand Albert married Antoinette Amalie (1696–1762), youngest daughter of his first cousin Louis Rudolph, Duke of Brunswick-Lüneburg and his wife Princess Christine Louise of Oettingen-Oettingen, on 15 October 1712. They had 12 children who reached adulthood.

Charles I, Duke of Brunswick-Wolfenbüttel (1 August 1713 – 26 March 1780) married Princess Philippine Charlotte of Prussia and had issue.
Anthony Ulrich of Brunswick-Wolfenbüttel (28 August 1714 – 4 May 1774 (O.S.)) married Grand Duchess Anna Leopoldovna of Russia and had issue. He and his children were treated barbarically by Empress Elizabeth of Russia and he died in prison.
Elisabeth Christine of Brunswick-Wolfenbüttel (8 November 1715 – 13 January 1797) married Frederick the Great of Prussia, no issue.
Ludwig Ernest of Brunswick-Wolfenbüttel (25 September 1718 – 12 May 1788) died unmarried.
Ferdinand of Brunswick-Wolfenbüttel (12 January 1721 – 3 July 1792) died unmarried.
Luise of Brunswick-Wolfenbüttel (29 January 1722 – 13 January 1780) married Prince Augustus William of Prussia and had issue, including Frederick William II of Prussia.
Sophie Antoinette of Brunswick-Wolfenbüttel (13/23 January 1724 – 17 May 1802) married Ernest Frederick, Duke of Saxe-Coburg-Saalfeld and had issue.
Albert of Brunswick-Wolfenbüttel (1725–1745) died unmarried.
Charlotte of Brunswick-Wolfenbüttel (1725–1766) died unmarried.
Theresa Natalie of Brunswick-Wolfenbüttel (4 June 1728 – 26 June 1778) died unmarried.
Juliana Maria of Brunswick-Wolfenbüttel (4 September 1729 – 10 October 1796) married Frederick V of Denmark and had issue.
Frederick William of Brunswick-Wolfenbüttel (1731–1732) died in infancy.
Frederick Francis of Brunswick-Wolfenbüttel (1732–1758) died unmarried at the Battle of Hochkirch.

Issue
Note: list may be incomplete.

Ancestry

References
 At the House of Welf site (in German)

House of Brunswick-Bevern
Princes of Wolfenbüttel
1680 births
1735 deaths
Protestant monarchs
Field marshals of the Holy Roman Empire
Burials at Brunswick Cathedral
Military personnel from Lower Saxony